Flambeau may refer to:
 A burning torch, especially one carried in procession
Flambeau, a multi-flame torch traditionally carried in night parades during New Orleans Mardi Gras, Louisiana
Fiesta Flambeau parade, during Fiesta San Antonio, Texas
 Flambeau River, northern Wisconsin
 Flambeau, Price County, Wisconsin
 Flambeau, Rusk County, Wisconsin
 Flambeau 400, a former Chicago and North Western passenger train
 Flambeau, one of the founding members of the Order of Hermes in the game Ars Magica 
 Flambeau, a flame fed by natural gas on early natural gas wells to show that the gas was flowing; see Gas flare
 Flambeau butterfly Dryas iulia
 Flambeau (character), a character in G. K. Chesterton's Father Brown stories
 Flambeau (magazine), Saint Vincent magazine
 FSView & Florida Flambeau, a student newspaper at Florida State University

See also
Lac du Flambeau, Wisconsin